Ronalds Cinks (born 11 March 1990) is a retired Latvian professional ice hockey player who played for Dinamo Riga in the KHL and represented Latvia as a junior four times.  He most recently played for HK Mogo of the Latvian Hockey Higher League.

References 

 

1990 births
Living people
Latvian ice hockey forwards
HK Riga 2000 players
Dinamo Riga players
Ice hockey people from Riga